She Said may refer to:
 She Said (book), a 2019 nonfiction book about the exposure of film producer Harvey Weinstein's sexual abuse
 She Said (film), a 2022 film based on the nonfiction book
 "She Said" (Plan B song), 2010
 "She Said" (The Pharcyde song),1995
 "She Said" (Collective Soul song), 1998
 "She Said", a song by Barclay James Harvest from the 1971 album Once Again
 "She Said", a song by actor Brie Larson from the 2005 album Finally Out of P.E.
 "She Said", a song by Longpigs from the 1996 album The Sun Is Often Out
 "She Said", a song by Scooter from the 1997 album Age of Love
 "She Said", an album by Starcrawler

See also
 "She Said She Said", a 1966 song by The Beatles from Revolver
 Leavin' Trunk/She Said, She Said, a limited edition vinyl single by The Black Keys